Unsa II was a ruler of the Kingdom of Sennar. He was the son of Nassir, the brother of the previous ruler Rabat I; Unsa ascended to the throne in 1681.

The most noteworthy event of his reign was a great famine afflicted his kingdom, which forced the inhabitants to kill and eat dogs.

References 

Rulers of Sennar
17th-century African people
1692 deaths